Marcella Craft (August 11, 1874 – December 12, 1959) was an American operatic soprano who performed internationally in the late 19th century and early 20th century.

Personal life
Born Marcia Craft in Indianapolis, Indiana, she moved with her family to Riverside, California in 1887.  Craft graduated from Riverside High School in 1893.  During the graduation ceremony, at Riverside's Loring Opera House, she performed her first public solo.

Encouraged by the community, and with contributions from local businessmen, Craft studied opera in Boston, Massachusetts under maestro Charles R. Adams.  Upon completion of her studies, she traveled to Italy for additional tutoring.

In 1917 Craft purchased a home for her parents on Prospect Avenue in Riverside.  After leaving Germany in 1932, she returned to Riverside and also lived in the Prospect Avenue home until her death in 1959.  She is buried in Riverside's Evergreen Cemetery.

Career
While in Italy Craft's tutor changed her name to Marcella, and she started receiving leading operatic roles. She sang with Enrico Caruso and others.  Her biggest success came after she moved to Germany, where she became a lead with the Munich Opera.

Although her career primarily kept her in Europe, Craft regularly returned to Riverside where she frequently sang at the annual Easter Sunrise Service on Mount Rubidoux.

References

Bibliography
 Hall, Joan H.  Through the Doors of the Mission Inn, Chapter 5, Marcella Craft; Highgrove Press, 1996. . LOC: 95–95291.

Citations and notes

American operatic sopranos
Musicians from Riverside, California
Burials at Evergreen Cemetery (Riverside, California)
1874 births
1959 deaths
Musicians from Indianapolis
Singers from California
19th-century American actresses
American stage actresses
20th-century American actresses
Classical musicians from California
19th-century American women opera singers
20th-century American women opera singers
Singers from Indiana
Classical musicians from Indiana